19th Visual Effects Society Awards
April 6, 2021

Outstanding Visual Effects in a Photoreal Feature:
The Midnight Sky

Outstanding Visual Effects in a Photoreal Episode:
The Mandalorian – The Marshal

The 19th Visual Effects Society Awards was an awards ceremony held by the Visual Effects Society. Nominations were announced on March 1, 2021, and the ceremony took place on April 6, 2021.

Nominees

Honorary Awards
Lifetime Achievement Award:
Peter Jackson
VES Award for Creative Excellence
Robert Legato

Film

Television

Other categories

References

External links
 Visual Effects Society

2021
2020 film awards
2021 television awards